Sirvart Kalpakyan Karamanuk (1 December 1912 – 20 October 2008) was an Armenian composer, pianist and teacher, living in Istanbul.

Early life
Karamanuk was born in the Üsküdar district of Constantinople [now Istanbul], Ottoman Empire. She began studying the piano at the age of five with Stepan Papelyan, and later graduated from the Istanbul Municipal Conservatory [now Istanbul University State Conservatory] in 1939, where her principal teacher was Ferdi Statzer. She also took classes with Cemal Reşit Rey, Ahmet Adnan Saygun and Licco Amar in music theory, history and chamber music. Subsequently, Karamanuk took private lessons in piano with Lazare Lévy and composition with Jean Roger-Ducasse for a short period.

Career
Karamanuk composed numerous songs, choral works, large-scale compositions for chorus and orchestra (Akhtamar and The Song of Bedros Tourian), a children’s operetta (Tomorrow’s Artists), children's songs, piano compositions, and arrangements of liturgical chants. Her works have been performed in several countries and recorded by distinguished soloists and ensembles. Concerts devoted entirely to her compositions have been organised in Yerevan's Aram Khachaturian House-Museum and Aram Khachaturian Concert Hall. In 2004, a film titled Akhtamar based on Karamanuk's eponymous symphonic poem was premiered in Yerevan's Moscow Cinema. Her compositions are published by the Armenian General Benevolent Union of America, the Turkish-Armenian Teachers Association of Istanbul and the Charents Museum of Literature and Arts of Armenia, where her manuscripts are reposited.

Honors
She was honored with a pontifical encyclical and the St. Sahag-St. Mesrob Medal from the Catholicos of All Armenians, Vazgen I; a pontifical encyclical and the St. Mesrob Mashtots Medal from the Catholicos of the Holy See of Cilicia, Aram I. She also received a pastoral letter and a celebrative medal by Patriarch Mesrob II Mutafyan of Constantinople. In 2005 Robert Kocharyan, former President of Armenia, issued a proclamation of gratitude to Sirvart Karamanuk, for her enduring contributions to Armenian culture.

Compositions

Vocal-orchestral
Ախթամար • Akhtamar • (Akhtamar), 1969
Գարնան առաւօտ • Karnan aravod • (A Spring Morning), 1969
Երգ Պետրոս Դուրեանի • Yerk Bedros Turyani • (The Song of Bedros Tourian), 1972

Vocal (solo)
Տէ՛ր, ես քեզմէ ուզեցի • Der, yes kezme uzetsi • (I beseeched you, O Lord), 1946 
Եարճան • Yar, jan • (Beloved), 1946
Նէ • Ne
Ի՞նչ կ՚ըսեն • Inch gısen?
Սիրերգ • Sirerk
Այնքան շատ • Aynkan shad
Սիրտ ունենք, սէր չունենք •Sird unenk, ser chunenk
Հոգիս • Hokis
Երեք կոչերը • Yerek gocherı
Ինչ անեմ որ հաւատաս • Inch anem vor havadas
Նամակ • Namag
Օրօրոցի մօտ • Ororotsi mod
Սիրտը • Sirdı
Ես որ մեռնեմ • Yes vor mernem
Անանուն • Ananun
Սիրերգ • Sirerk 
Սէր • Ser
Մի՛ մերձենար յիս • Mi mertsenar his
Կոյսը • Guysı
Ողջակէզ • Voghchagez
Սաղմոս • Saghmos
Օրօր • Oror
Երջանկութիւն • Yerchangutyun
Սպասում • Sbasum
Սէր անայլայլ • Ser anaylayl
Բանաստեղծութիւն • Panasdeghdzutyun
Ներբող Դուրեանի • Nerpogh Turyani
Երկնէր երկին և երկիր  • Yergner yergin yev yergir
Եկէսցէ • Yegestse
Ես որ մեռնեմ • Yes vor mernem
Վերջալոյսին դէմ • Verchaluysin tem
Աշնանային • Ashnanayin
Եթէ • Yete
Անտուն գիշերներ • Andun kisherner
Օտա՜ր, ամայի՜ • Odar, amayi
Կ՚ուզես լինեմ վշտի ցօղեր • Guzes linem vshdi tsogher
Փափաք • Papak
Ես սիրեցի • Yes siretsi
Մայիսեան վարդեր • Mayisyan varter
Բարի երկինք (երգաշար) • Pari yergink
Սիրել վերջին շունչով • Sirel verchin shunchov
Ինչ աղուոր է • Inch aghvor e
Գարուն • Karun
Գարունն եմ ես • Karun n'em es
Երեսդ վառի  • Yerest vari
Օրէ օր • Ore or
Իրիկունը վերջին • Irigunı verchin
Ամէն գիշեր • Amen kisher
Խօսք առ բանաստեղծութիւն • Kosk ar panasdeghdzutyun
Մայրամուտ • Mayramud
Հեգնանք • Heknank
Սուրբին աղօթքը • Surpin aghotkı
Անգամ մը միայն • Ankam mı miayn
Մայր • Mayr
Սուտ կամ իրաւ • Sud gam irav
Մի՛ դպիք • Mi tbik
Վերյիշում • Verhishum
Կապոյտ ու դալար • Gabuys u talar
Սպասում • Sbasum
Խաղը կեանքի • Khaghı gyanki
Սկսիլ • Sgsil
Քառասմբակ սէրերով • Karasmpag sererov
Գայլին մահը • Kaylin mahı
Հայաստան ասելիս • Hayasdan aselis
Վոգալիզ • Vokaliz
Երազներ իմ կորած • Yerazner im goradz

Vocal (duet)
Կոյսի հոգի • Guysi hoki (The soul of the virgin)
Հովուերգութիւն • Hovverkutyun
Խարխափում • Kharkhapum
Առաւօտ • Aravod (Morning)

Choral (secular)
Պագնեմ զքո լայն ճակատ • Baknem zko layn jagad • (Let Me Kiss Your Clear Forehead), 1956
Գարուն-Պարերգ • Karun/Barerk
Հունձք կը ժողվեմ • Huntsk gı zhoghvem • (Harvesting), 1961
Անի • Ani • (Ani)
Դժար տարի • Tzhar dari • (Hard Year), 1969
Ճան իմ յա՜ր • Jan im yar
Սի՛րտս երկինք է • Sirds yergink e • (My Heart Wide as the Sky), 1975
Բինկէօլ • Bingoel • (Bingöl), 1975
Արեւի պէս սիրուն • Arevi bes sirun
Ծամերդ հուսել • Dzamert husel
Ճան իմ եար • Jan im yar
Արամ Խաչատրեան • Aram Khachadryan
Մի՛ երկնչիր, հօտ փոքրիկ • Mi yergnchir hod pokrig • (Do Not Fear, Little Flock), 1989
Սիրոյ աղջիկ • Siro aghchig
Սուրբ Գեղարդ • Surp Keghart • (Holy Geghard), 1993 
Երեսդ վառի • Yerest vari • 1997
Սուրբ Մեսրոպ • Surp Mesrob • 2003

Choral (sacred)
Սուրբ Աստուած • Surp Asdvadz • (Holy Lord)
Ճաշու շարական (ԱՁ, ԲՁ, ԳՁ, ԴՁ, ԱԿ, ԲԿ, ԳԿ, ԴԿ) •  Jashu sharagan • (Eight Synaxis Hymns), 1968 
Ի Սբ. կոյսն Հռիփսիմէ • I Surp guysn Hripsime • (To Virgin Holy Rhipsime), 1973

Choral (occasional pieces)
Էսաեանի քայլերգ • Esayani kaylerk
Գարակէօզեանի քայլերգ • Karagoezyani kaylerk
Կոմիտասի քայլերգ • Gomidasi kaylerk
Է.Ս.Մ. 25-ամեակի քայլերգ • Esayan sanuts miutyan 25-amyagi kaylerk • 
Դպրեվանքի քայլերգ • Tbrevanki kaylerk • 1987
Ձօն՝ Դպրոցասէրցի մանուկներուն • Tson Tbrotsasertsi manugnerun • 1994
Վիէննայի քայլերգ • Viennayi kaylerk • 1995
Զուարթնոցի քայլերգ • Zvartnotsi kaylerk • 1996
Թարգմանչաց վարժարանի քայլերգ • Tarkmanchats varzharani kaylerk • 2006
Ձօներգ՝ Հայկ և Անժէլ Արսլանեաններուն • Tsonerk Hayg yev Anzhel Arslanyannerun • 2007
Ազգային հիւանդանոցի քայլերգ • Azkayin hivantanotsi kaylerk • 2007
Սուրբ Յակոբ հիւանդանոցի քայլերգ • Surp Hagop hivantanotsi kaylerk • 2008

Children's operetta
Վաղուան արուեստագէտները • Vaghvan arvesdakednerı • (Tomorrow's Artists), 1949

Children's songs
88 songs for children (1988-1992)

Instrumental
Petite suite en do, pn, 1940
Largo maestoso, pn, 1940
La Tonkinoise, pn, 1941
Histoire bizarre, pn, 1941
Pastorale, pn, 1942
Trois mignons, pn, 1942
Երիտասարդութիւն, հասունութիւն, ծերութիւն (Youth, Maturity, Old Age), pn, 1943
Admiration, pn, 1944
Caprice orientale, pn, 1945
Պարերգ (Dance-song), pn, 1946
Կոյսի հոգի • Guysi hoki, st.qrt, 1973

References

Sources
Sirvart Karamanuk's Armeniapedia entry

Further reading
The World Who’s Who of Women, 1982. International Biographical Center, Cambridge, England. p. 419 
International Who’s Who in Music and Musician’s Directory, 1980. Cambridge, England. p. 374 
Dictionary of International Biography, 2000.  Cambridge, England. p. 188 
«ՍԻՐՎԱՐԴ ԳԱՐԱՄԱՆՈՒԿ (1912 - 2008)». Գրիգոր Ալոզեան. Հայրենիք. Դեկտեմբեր 2, 2017, էջ 12.

1912 births
2008 deaths
Armenian composers
Women composers
Musicians from Istanbul
Armenians from the Ottoman Empire
20th-century women musicians
Burials at Şişli Armenian Cemetery